The 2004 North Hertfordshire District Council election was held on 10 June 2004, at the same time as other local elections across England and Wales and the European elections. 17 of the 49 seats on North Hertfordshire District Council were up for election, being the usual third of the council plus a by-election in Knebworth ward.

Overall results
The overall results were as follows:

Ward Results
The results for each ward were as follows. An asterisk(*) indicates a sitting councillor standing for re-election.

The by-election in Knebworth was caused by the resignation of Conservative councillor Jane Gray.

Changes 2004–2006
A by-election was held in Hitchin Bearton ward on 5 May 2005, alongside the county council election and general election, to replace Labour councillor Peter Terry. Labour's Deepak Sangha retained the seat for the party.

A by-election was held on 17 November 2005 in Baldock East ward to replace Liberal Democrat councillor Geoffrey Hollands. The party retained the seat.

References

2004 English local elections
2004